Resting Springs are historical springs in Inyo County, California East of Tecopa.

References

Bodies of water of Inyo County, California
Springs of California
Old Spanish Trail (trade route)
Mormon Road